Gottlieb Paludan Architects is a Danish architectural firm that provides consultancy services within infrastructure, construction and landscape architecture.

The firm was founded in Copenhagen in 1901. As of 2015, it employs approximately 100 architects, constructing architects and other specialists.

Selected projects

Completed

Substation, Copenhagen Airport (1999)
DR Byen - Segment 3 (2006) 
Peak-load plant KLC2, Copenhagen Airport (2006)
Renovation of Copenhagen Central Station (2008)
DSB Headquarters (2013)
Funder Motorway Bridge (2012)
Renovation of Nørreport Station (2015) 
Odense Foot and Cycle Bridge (2015) 
 Carlsberg station, Copenhagen, Denmark (2016)

In progress
 Odense Foot & Cycle Bridge, Odense, Denmark
 BIO4 biomass unit, Copenhagen, Denmark
 Spot #40: Waste-to-energy, Shenzhen, China (competition win, February 2016

Notes

External links 
Official Gottlieb Paludan Architects website

Architecture firms of Denmark
Danish companies established in 2001
Design companies established in 1901